Bazargan may refer to:

Places
 Bazargan, Afghanistan
 Bazargan, Chaharmahal and Bakhtiari, a village in Chaharmahal and Bakhtiari Province, Iran
 Bazargan, Darab, a village in Fars Province, Iran
 Bazargan, Iran, a city in West Azerbaijan Province, Iran
 Bazargan, Piranshahr, a village in West Azerbaijan Province, Iran
 Bazargan, Qazvin, a village in Qazvin Province, Iran
 Bazargan District, Iran

People with the surname
Abolfazl Bazargan, Iranian activist and politician
Mehdi Bazargan (1907–1995), Iranian scholar and politician